The Smugglers' Banquet is a 1952 Belgian crime film directed by Henri Storck. It was entered into the 1952 Cannes Film Festival.

Cast
In alphabetical order
 Marguerite Daulboys
 Yves Deniaud – Van Mol
 Arthur Devère – Fabriekskoncierge
 Marthe Dua
 Fred Engelen – Douane-lieutenant
 Ludzer Eringa – Nederlandse Burgemeester
 Paul Frankeur – Auguste Demeuse
 Kurt Großkurth – Dikke Charles
 Käthe Haack – Moeder van Elsa
 Gert Günther Hoffmann
 Daniel Ivernel – Jef
 Karl John – Hans
 Jean-Pierre Kérien – Pierre
 Christiane Lénier – Siska van Moll
 Robert Lussac – Smokkelaar
 Charles Mahieu – Lieutenant van de rijkswacht
 Mia Mendelson
 Maryse Paillet – Kobi
 Raymond Pellegrin – Michel Demeuse
 Sylvain Poons – Vrachtwagenbestuurder
 Françoise Rosay – Gabrielle Demeuse
 Eva Ingeborg Scholz – Elsa Menzler
 André Valmy – Le douanier Louis
 Edgar Willy – Arbeider

References

External links

1952 films
1950s French-language films
1952 crime films
Belgian black-and-white films
Films directed by Henri Storck
Belgian crime films
French-language Belgian films